Yinka Shonibare CBE, RA, (born 9 August 1962), is a British-Nigerian artist living in the United Kingdom. His work explores cultural identity, colonialism and post-colonialism within the contemporary context of globalisation. A hallmark of his art is the brightly coloured Ankara fabric he uses. Because he has a physical disability that paralyses one side of his body, Shonibare uses assistants to make works under his direction.

Life and career

Yinka Shonibare was born in London, England, on 9 August 1962, the son of Olatunji Shonibare and Laide Shonibare. When he was three years old, his family moved to Lagos, Nigeria, where his father practised law. When he was 17 years old, Shonibare returned to Britain to do his A-levels at Redrice School. At the age of 18, he contracted transverse myelitis, an inflammation of the spinal cord, which resulted in a long-term physical disability where one side of his body is paralysed.

Shonibare went on to study Fine Art first at Byam Shaw School of Art (now Central Saint Martins College of Art and Design) and then at Goldsmiths, University of London, where he received his MFA degree, graduating as part of the Young British Artists generation. Following his studies, Shonibare worked as an arts development officer for Shape Arts, an organisation that makes arts accessible to people with disabilities.

In 1999, Shonibare created four alien-like sculptures that he named "Dysfunctional Family", the piece consisting of a mother and daughter, both coloured in textures of white and blue, and a father and son textured in the colours of red and yellow.

He has exhibited at the Venice Biennial and at leading museums worldwide. He was notably commissioned by Okwui Enwezor at documenta XI in 2002 to create his most recognised work, Gallantry and Criminal Conversation, which launched him on the international stage.

In 2004, he was shortlisted for the Turner Prize for his Double Dutch exhibition at the Museum Boijmans van Beuningen in Rotterdam and for his solo show at the Stephen Friedman Gallery, London. Of the four nominees, he seemed to be the most popular with the general public that year, with a BBC website poll resulting in 64 per cent of voters stating that his work was their favourite.

Shonibare became an Honorary Fellow of Goldsmiths' College in 2003, was awarded an MBE in 2004, received an Honorary Doctorate (Fine Artist) of the Royal College of Art in 2010 and was appointed a CBE in 2019. He was elected Royal Academician by the Royal Academy of Arts in 2013. He joined Iniva's Board of trustees in 2009. He has exhibited at the Venice Biennial and internationally at leading museums worldwide. In September 2008, his major mid-career survey commenced at the MCA Sydney and toured to the Brooklyn Museum, New York, in June 2009 and the National Museum of African Art of the Smithsonian Institution, Washington DC, in October 2009. In 2010, Nelson's Ship in a Bottle became his first public art commission on the Fourth Plinth in Trafalgar Square.

On 3 December 2016, one of Shonibare's "Wind Sculpture" pieces was installed in front of the Smithsonian's National Museum of African Art (NMAA) in Washington, DC. The painted fibreglass work, titled "Wind Sculpture VII", is the first sculpture to be permanently installed outside the NMAA's entrance.

He runs Guest Projects, a project space for emerging artists based in Broadway Market, east London. He is extending this to spaces in Lagos, Nigeria.

Work 

Shonibare's work explores issues of colonialism alongside those of race and class, through a range of media which include painting, sculpture, photography, installation art, and, more recently, film and performance. He examines, in particular, the construction of identity and tangled interrelationship between Africa and Europe and their respective economic and political histories. Mining Western art history and literature, he asks what constitutes our collective contemporary identity today. Having described himself as a "post-colonial" hybrid, Shonibare questions the meaning of cultural and national definitions. While he often makes work inspired by his own life and experiences around him, he takes inspiration from around the world; as he has said: "I’m a citizen of the world, I watch television so I make work about these things."

A key material in Shonibare's work since 1994 is the brightly coloured "African" fabric (Dutch wax-printed cotton) that he buys himself from Brixton market in London. "But actually, the fabrics are not really authentically African the way people think," says Shonibare. "They prove to have a crossbred cultural background quite of their own. And it's the fallacy of that signification that I like. It's the way I view culture – it's an artificial construct." Shonibare claims that the fabrics were first manufactured in Europe to sell in Indonesian markets and were then sold in Africa after being rejected in Indonesia. Today the main exporters of "African" fabric from Europe are based in Manchester in the UK and Vlisco Véritable Hollandais from Helmond in the Netherlands. Despite being a European invention, the Dutch wax fabric is used by many Africans in England, such as Shonibare. He has these fabrics made up into European 18th-century dresses, covering sculptures of alien figures or stretched onto canvases and thickly painted over.

Shonibare is well known for creating headless, life-size sculptural figures meticulously positioned and dressed in vibrant wax cloth patterns in order for history and racial identity to be made complex and difficult to read. In his 2003 artwork Scramble for Africa, Shonibare reconstructs the Berlin Conference of 1884–1885, when European leaders negotiated and arbitrarily divided the continent in order to claim African territories. By exploring colonialism, particularly in this tableaux piece, the purpose of the headless figurines implies the loss of humanity as Shonibare explains: "I wanted to represent these European leaders as mindless in their hunger for what the Belgian King Leopold II called 'a slice of this magnificent African cake.'" Scramble for Africa cannot be read as a "simple satire", but rather it reveals "the relationship between the artist and the work". It is also an examination of how history tends to repeat itself. Shonibare states: "When I was making it I was really thinking about American imperialism and the need in the West for resources such as oil and how this pre-empts the annexation of different parts of the world."

Shonibare's Trumpet Boy, a permanent acquisition displayed at The Foundling Museum, demonstrates the colourful fabric used in his works. The sculpture was created to fit the theme of "found", reflecting on the museum's heritage, through combining new and existing work with found objects kept for their significance.

He also recreates the paintings of famous artists using headless mannequins with Batik or Ankara textiles instead of European fabrics. He uses these fabrics when depicting European art and fashion to portray a 'culture clash' and a theme of cultural interaction within postcolonialism. An example of some of these recreations would be Gainsborough's Mr and Mrs Andrews Without Their Heads (1998) and Reverend on Ice (2005) (after The Rev Robert Walker Skating on Duddingston Loch by Raeburn).

One artist he recreated multiple works of was Jean Honoré Fragonard. He recreated Fragonard's series The Progress of Love (1771-1773), which included his works The Meeting, The Pursuit, The Love Letter, and The Swing. A unique inclusion within these recreations, was the inclusion of branded fabric. The Swing (After Fragonard) (2001) has the woman on the swing wearing an imitation or 'knock-off' Chanel patterned fabric. The use of this fabric was meant to further explore the themes of post-colonialism, globalism, and cultural interaction that are present throughout much of his work, while also commenting on the consumerism and consumer culture of the modern world and how all of these themes intersect.

Shonibare also takes carefully posed photographs and videos recreating famous British paintings or stories from literature but with himself taking centre stage as an alternative, black British dandy – for example, A Rake's Progress by Hogarth, which Shonibare translates into Diary of A Victorian Dandy (1998), or his Dorian Gray (2001), named after Oscar Wilde's novel The Picture of Dorian Gray.

Considerably larger than a usual ship in a bottle, yet much smaller than the real HMS Victory, in fact a 1:30-scale model, Shonibare's Nelson's Ship in a Bottle, was "the first commission on the Fourth Plinth to reflect specifically on the historical symbolism of Trafalgar Square, which commemorates the Battle of Trafalgar, and will link directly with Nelson's column." The work was placed there on 24 May 2010 and remained until 30 January 2012, being widely admired. In 2011, the Art Fund launched a campaign and successfully raised money for the purchase and relocation of the sculpture to the National Maritime Museum in Greenwich, where it found its new permanent home.

Other works include printed ceramics, and cloth-covered shoes, upholstery, walls and bowls.

In October 2013, Shonibare took part in Art Wars at the Saatchi Gallery curated by Ben Moore. The artist was issued with a stormtrooper helmet, which he transformed into a work of art. Proceeds went to the Missing Tom Fund, set up by Ben Moore to find his brother Tom, who has been missing for more than 10 years. The work was also shown on the Regent's Park platform as part of Art Below Regents Park.

The Goodman Gallery announced in 2018 that the Norval Foundation, South Africa's newest art museum based in Cape Town, has made a permanent acquisition of Shonibare's Wind Sculpture (SG) III, making it a first for the African continent. The sculpture will be unveiled in February 2019, increasing the British-Nigerian artist's visibility on the continent where he grew up.

Shonibare has collaborated with Bellerby & Co, Globemakers.

Selected artworks/exhibitions 
Shonibare's first solo exhibition was in 1989 at Byam Shaw Gallery, London. During 2008–09, he was the subject of a major mid-career survey in both Australia and the USA; starting in September 2008 at the Museum of Contemporary Art Australia (MCA), Sydney, and toured to the Brooklyn Museum, New York, in June 2009 and the Museum of African Art at the Smithsonian Institution, Washington DC, in October 2009. For the 2009 Brooklyn Museum exhibition, he created a site-specific installation titled Mother and Father Worked Hard So I Can Play which was on view in several of the Museum's period rooms. Another site-specific installation, Party Time—Re-Imagine America: A Centennial Commission was simultaneously on view at the Newark Museum in Newark, New Jersey, from 1 July 2009, to 3 January 2010, in the dining-room of the museum's 1885 Ballantine House.

1994: Double Dutch – small deep squares of stretched fabric painted over, on a shocking-pink wall
1997: Sensation A group exhibition drawn from the personal collection of Charles Saatchi – Shonibare had two Victorian-style dresses in the show in the style of Dressing Down.
1997: Cha Cha Cha – a pair of 1950s women's shoes, covered in fabric and encased in a perspex cube
1997: Feather Pink More squares of fabric, painted on both the front and edges, with a white background
1998: Diary of A Victorian Dandy – photographs of Shonibare in group setups reminiscent of A Rake's Progress by William Hogarth, commissioned for the London Underground
1999: Dressing Down exhibition at the Ikon Gallery, Birmingham, UK.
1999: Dysfunctional Family – sculptures of aliens covered in fabric
2000: Vacation – Space-suited men covered in African fabric, busy up at the ceilings by the chandeliers
2001: Dorian Gray – black and white photographs of Shonibare as Oscar Wilde's Dorian Gray
2001: The Swing (after Fragonard) – a headless lifesize recreation of Jean-Honoré Fragonard's model clothed in African fabric
2001: Henry James and Hendrik C. Andersen – two clothed headless lifesize models of the writer Henry James and the sculptor Hendrik Christian Andersen, symbolising their friendship and commissioned by The British School at Rome
2001: The Three Graces – Three headless lifesize models of women of varying proportions, in Victorian dress made from African fabric
 2002: Gallantry and Criminal Conversation – an installation including a suspended coach, wooden chests and 18 headless 18th-century figures engaged in copulation
2002: Untitled (Dollhouse); from the 2002 Peter Norton Family Christmas Project – a dollhouse replica of a two-storey Victorian-style flat in the East End of London
2003: Maxa – circles of partially painted fabric on a deep blue wall
2004: Un Ballo in Maschera (A Masked Ball)] – his first film, showing the assassination of King Gustav III of Sweden through dance
2005: Lady on Unicycle – a headless Victorian lady in knickerbockers frozen mid-cycle
2008: Yinka Shonibare: solo exhibition at the Museum of Contemporary Art, Sydney, Australia
2009: Yinka Shonibare: solo exhibition at the Brooklyn Museum, Brooklyn, New York City, USA.
2009–2010: Yinka Shonibare MBE: solo exhibition at the Smithsonian National Museum of African Art (organised and toured by the Museum of Contemporary Art, Sydney, Australia)
2010: "Before and After Modernism: Byam Shaw, Rex Vicat Cole, Yinka Shonibare MBE", Lethaby Gallery, Central St. Martin's, London, England
2010: Trumpet Boy participating in the exhibition FOUND at The Foundling Museum in 2016 
2010–2012: Nelson's Ship in a Bottle, Fourth Plinth, Trafalgar Square, London, England
2013: FABRIC-ATION, The first major UK survey of work, at Yorkshire Sculpture Park, England U.K.
2013: Wind Sculpture 1, Yorkshire Sculpture Park, England.
2015: "Rage of the Ballet Gods", James Cohan Gallery, New York City, USA.
2016: "Yinka Shonibare MBE", Yale Center for British Art, New Haven, Connecticut, USA.
2016: BODY/PLAY/POLITICS, Yokohama Museum of Art, Yokohama, Japan - group exhibition with Yee I-Lann, Apichatpong Weerasethakul, UuDam Tran Nguyen, Ishikawa Ryuichi and Tamura Yuichiro.
2016–2017: RA Family Album, Royal Academy of Arts, London, England.
2018: Wind Sculpture (SG) I, Doris C. Freedman Plaza, Central Park, New York City, USA.
2019: Yinka Shonibare CBE: The American Library, Speed Art Museum, Louisville, Kentucky, USA.
2020: Yinka Shonibare CBE. End of Empire, Museum der Moderne Salzburg, Salzburg, AT
2020: Yinka Shonibare CBE: Refugee Astronaut, Wellcome Collection, London UK

Awards 

 In 2004, Shonibare was granted the title Member of the Order of the British Empire (MBE). He ironically incorporates the title into his official artistic identity, as he states that it is "better to make an impact from within rather than from without… it's the notion of the Trojan horse... you go in unnoticed. And then you wreak havoc."
In 2019, Yinka Shonibare was awarded and decorated with the Commander of the Order of the British Empire (CBE).
 Yinka Shonibare received the Whitechapel Gallery Art Icon Award in March 2021. He is the 8th recipient of this award. The award celebrates artists who have made significant contributions to a particular medium.

Disability
Shonibare is now disabled, physically incapable of making works himself, and relies upon a team of assistants, operating himself as a conceptual artist.

Shonibare's disability has increased with age, resulting in him using an electric wheelchair. In later life, Shonibare has discussed his disability and its role within his work as a creative artist. In 2013, Shonibare was announced as patron of the annual Shape Arts "Open" exhibition where disabled and non-disabled artists are invited to submit work in response to an Open theme.

References

Further reading

External links

"Yinka Shonibare CBE", Stephen Friedman Gallery
Yinka Shonibare, MBE at James Cohan Gallery, New York
Yinka Shonibare, MBE (RA) at Pearl Lam Galleries, Hong Kong
Yinka Shonibare, MBE (RA) at Blain|Southern Galleries, Berlin
Yinka Shonibare MBE: Magic Ladders Barnes Foundation exhibition catalogue, 2014
 

1962 births
Living people
British people with disabilities
Black British artists
British contemporary artists
Alumni of Goldsmiths, University of London
20th-century British painters
British male painters
21st-century British painters
English installation artists
Photographers from London
British conceptual artists
British textile artists
English people of Nigerian descent
Commanders of the Order of the British Empire
Nigerian sculptors
Painters from London
British emigrants to Nigeria
English people of Yoruba descent
Yoruba artists
Alumni of the Byam Shaw School of Art
20th-century British sculptors
British male sculptors
Black British photographers
Artists with disabilities
Royal Academicians
21st-century male artists
21st-century British sculptors
20th-century British male artists
21st-century British male artists